Re Contra is the fourth studio album by the Serbian punk rock band Goblini, released by Metropolis Records in 1999.

Track listing 
All music, lyrics and arrangements by Goblini.

Personnel

The band 
 Vladislav Kokotović — bass, backing vocals
 Milan Arnautović "Firca" — drums
 Alen Jovanović — guitar, backing vocals
 Saša Šetka — guitar, backing vocals
 Branko Golubović "Golub" — vocals

Additional personnel 
 Dragoljub Marković — keyboards, backing vocals
 Nikola Vranjković — recorded by, guitar, backing vocals
 Aleksandar Radosavljević "Acke" — producer, engineer [postproduction], backing vocals
 Velja Mijanović — engineer [postproduction]
 Bora Veličković — trumpet
 Nemanja Kojić "Kojot" — trombone, backing vocals
 Dušan Petrović "Dile" — saxophone
 Aca — backing vocals
 Aleksandar Balać "Lale" — backing vocals
 Aleksandar Petrović "Aca Celtic" — backing vocals
 Saša Milenković "Sale" — backing vocals
 Vladimir Lazić "Laza" — backing vocals
 Zoran Đuroski "Đura Misterious" — backing vocals
 David Vartabedijan — artwork by [design, layout, prepress]
 Nebojša Stanković "Kulja" — photography, artwork by [front cover design]

References 
 Re Contra at Discogs
 EX YU ROCK enciklopedija 1960-2006, Janjatović Petar; 

1999 albums
Goblini albums
Metropolis Records (Serbia) albums
Alternative rock albums by Serbian artists